Challenge: The Magazine of Economic Affairs is a bimonthly magazine covering current affairs in economics. It is published by Routledge and the editor-in-chief is Jeff Madrick (The Cooper Union).

History 
The magazine was established in 1952 and originally published by the Institute of Economic Affairs (New York University). It ceased publishing in 1967 but was revived in 1973 and published by M. E. Sharpe which was later taken over by Routledge.

Abstracting and indexing 
The magazine is abstracted and indexed in:

References

External links 
 

Bimonthly magazines published in the United States
Business magazines published in the United States
English-language magazines
Magazines established in 1952
Routledge academic journals